Kaisa or karoliina is a cue sport mainly played in Finland. The game originated in Russia, where it is still played to some extent. Kaisa equipment is similar to Russian pyramid from the 68 mm ( in) balls, small pockets barely large enough for a ball to enter, and the long and heavy cue sticks. Kaisa tables are usually 10 feet long, and thus 2 feet shorter than official tournament Russian pyramid tables, which are 12 feet long. It is a two-player or two-team game. As with many carom billiards games, both players have their own  used to shoot at the other balls, and usually differentiated by one cue ball having a dot or other marking on it. In all, five balls are used: the yellow  (called the kaisa in Finnish), two red object balls, and the two white cue balls (each of which serves as an object ball for the opponent). The game is played to 60 , in a rather elaborate scoring system, reminiscent of those used in snooker and English billiards, with points being awarded for various types of shots. Like both Russian and English billiards, which are also played on large pocket billiards tables, kaisa is a hybrid of carom and pocket billiards game styles. Kaisa is principally a recreational game, without professional players. However, the first kaisa world championship tournament was held in April 2010. Participants came from 33 countries, and the main tournament was held in Kotka. A Finnish player, Marko Rautiainen, won the championship title.

Origins
Kaisa can be traced back to an 18th century game called Russian carambole played with two white cue balls and one red object ball. By the beginning of the 19th century, a new variant added two more object balls: a blue ball and a black, brown, or yellow ball called the karolin, caroline, or carline which gave the game its name.

Rules
The players  to decide who will be the first shooter; the player who wins the lag begins the game.

All shots must be  in detail. In most  games, nominating the object ball and the intended pocket is sufficient, but in kaisa the shooter must also call any  on other balls or  contacts on the path of the object ball to the pocket. After pocketing of the called object ball, any carom on or pocketing of another object ball for additional points (see below) need not be called.

The same player continues shooting after each successful shot, but yields the table to the next player after failing to earn points on a shot attempt. All pocketed balls are  before the next shot is taken, except the opponent's cue ball, which remains pocketed until the end of the current shooter's . Balls moved but not pocketed remain where they lie. The incoming player shoots from where that player's cue ball lies if it remains on the table, or has ball-in-hand behind the head string if that cue ball was pocketed by the previous player.

Scoring
Points are acquired by  the object balls with the cue ball, with additional points being available for additional feats. The game ends when one player earns 60 or more points.

Basic shots:
 Pocketing the opponent's white ball = 2 points
 Pocketing a red ball = 3 points
 Pocketing the yellow ball (kaisa) = 6 points

Additional points are awarded for  the cue ball to object balls (in any order) on the same shot, providing that the initial object ball was pocketed. This kind of carom is called nakki in Finnish (which translates to "vienna sausage" or "hot dog" in English). A  – causing an object ball to hit another object ball – does not award points.

In scoring nakki shots, the caromed balls are scored as in a basic shot (white is 2 points, each red is 3 points, yellow is 6 points), but the effective point value of the pocketed ball changes (white is effectively 1 point, each red is still 3 points, yellow is effectively 9 points). The result is the following nakki shot values:

 Pocketing opponent's white plus a carom (nakki) with a red = 4 points
 Pocketing opponent's white plus caroms with both reds = 7 points
 Pocketing opponent's white plus a carom with the yellow = 7 points
 Pocketing opponent's white plus caroms with the yellow and a red = 10 points
 Pocketing opponent's white plus caroms with the yellow and both reds = 13 points
 Pocketing a red plus a carom with opponent's white = 5 points
 Pocketing a red plus a carom with the other red = 6 points
 Pocketing a red plus a caroms with the other red and opponent's white = 8 points
 Pocketing a red plus a carom with the yellow = 9 points
 Pocketing a red plus a carom with the yellow and opponent's white = 11 points
 Pocketing a red plus caroms with the yellow and the other red = 12 points
 Pocketing a red plus caroms with the yellow, the other red and opponent's white = 14 points
 Pocketing the yellow plus a carom with opponent's white = 11 points
 Pocketing the yellow plus a carom with a red = 12 points
 Pocketing the yellow plus caroms with opponent's white and a red = 14
 Pocketing the yellow plus caroms with both reds = 15 points
 Pocketing the yellow plus caroms with the opponent's white and both reds = 17 points

A special 12-point shot is pocketing the yellow kaisa  (yli keskelle in Finnish) as the first-struck object ball. It does not matter which ball hit the  first, the cue ball (a ) or the kaisa (a ). This adds an additional 6 points to the shot's value, which otherwise accumulates like a regular object-ball pocketing shot:

 Pocketing the yellow cross-side plus a carom with opponent's white = 17 points
 Pocketing the yellow cross-side plus a carom with a red = 18 points
 Pocketing the yellow cross-side plus caroms with opponent's white and a red = 20 points
 Pocketing the yellow cross-side plus caroms with both reds = 21 points
 Pocketing the yellow cross-side plus caroms with opponent's white and both reds = 23 points

Additionally, the player gets still more points if a ball with which the cue ball caromed for additional points (i.e. a nakki ball) is also pocketed on the same shot. The number of points is awarded by the pocketed ball's value: white = 2, red = 3, yellow = 6. For example, if a player pockets the yellow kaisa, and caroms a red nakki ball into a pocket, the score is 15 points (kaisa pocketed for 6, nakki carom off pocketed kaisa for 3, red hit on nakki carom for 3, plus red ball in a pocket for 3, equals 15).

Fouls

If a player  his/her cue ball into a pocket or off the table, the player's points are reduced according to which ball the cue ball hit first (e.g. a scratch off the yellow kaisa deducts 6 points). If no ball is hit before the scratch, the penalty is simply 2 points.

References

External links
 Carline or Caroline 1866 rules for Russian game

Pool (cue sports)
Finnish games